is a passenger railway station in located in Nishi-ku, Sakai, Osaka Prefecture, Japan, operated by West Japan Railway Company (JR West).

Lines

Station layout
The station consists of two opposed elevated side platforms with the station building underneath. The station is staffed.

Platforms

Adjacent stations

History
Tsukuno Station opened on 1 September 1960.

Station numbering was introduced in March 2018 with Tsukuno being assigned station number JR-R32.

Passenger statistics
In fiscal 2019, the station was used by an average of 2223 passengers daily (boarding passengers only).

Surrounding Area
 Yamato River
 Sakai Women's Junior College
 Kaorigaoka Liberte High School
 Sakai Liberal Junior and Senior High School
 Sakai City Asakayama Junior High School

History
Tsukuno Station opened on 1 September 1960. With the privatization of the Japan National Railways (JNR) on 1 April 1987, the station came under the aegis of the West Japan Railway Company.

Passenger statistics
In fiscal 2019, the station was used by an average of 8325 passengers daily (boarding passengers only).

Surrounding Area
 Sakai City Medical Center
Sakai City Tsukuno Elementary School
Sakai City Tsukuno Junior High School
Sakai City Hamadera Junior High School

See also
List of railway stations in Japan

References

External links

 Tsukuno Station information 

Railway stations in Osaka Prefecture
Railway stations in Japan opened in 1960
Sakai, Osaka